Backeljaia gigaxii is a species of air-breathing land snail, terrestrial pulmonate gastropod mollusc in the family Geomitridae.

Description
The 5.4-8.1 × 7.4-12.2 mm. shell of this species has, in comparison with Candidula intersecta, whorls that increase more rapidly, the inside of the umbilicus is very narrow, but remarkably wider at last whorl. The shell is light brown or sandy-coloured with pale colour bands. It is usually flatter and larger than the shell of C. intersecta.

Distribution

This species is known to occur in a number of Western European countries and islands including:
Great Britain
Ireland
France
Italy
Belgium
Netherlands
Germany
Spain

References

 Studer, S. (1820). Kurzes Verzeichnis der bis jetzt in unserm Vaterlande entdeckten Conchylien. Naturwissenschaftlicher Anzeiger der Allgemeinen Schweizerischen Gesellschaft für die Gesammten Naturwissenschaften, 3 (11): 83-90; (12): 91-94. Bern

External links

Candidula gigaxii at Animalbase taxonomy, short description, distribution, biology, status (threats), images 
 Candidula gigaxii  images at Encyclopedia of Life
 Pfeiffer, L. (1847-1848). Monographia heliceorum viventium. Sistens descriptiones systematicas et criticas omnium huius familiae generum et specierum hodie cognitarum. Volumen primum. Lipsiae (Brockhaus). (1): 1–160 (1847) [before 27.9.; (2): 161–321 (1847 [after 27.9.]); (3): i-xxxii, 321–484 (before 23.6.1848).]
 Caziot, E. (1909). Description d'espèces nouvelles de mollusques terrestres et fluviatiles du département des Alpes-Maritimes. Bulletin de la Société zoologique de France. 34: 87-95, 99-104
 Servain, G. (1880). Etude sur les Mollusques recueillis en Espagne et au Portugal. Saint-Germain: Imprimerie D. Bardin. 172 pp

gigaxii
Gastropods described in 1847